Phooli village is located between Dildarnagar and Zamania in Ghazipur district in the Indian state of Uttar Pradesh. The village is close to the Ganges river.

Phooli is a very old village, it is one of the oldest in Ghazipur district.

The people of the village are primarily Hindu and Muslim. The common languages used are Hindi and Bhojpuri, with Bhojpuri being the day-to-day language.

Phooli has a bus station on the main road route between Zamania and Bara. Phooli provides the main primary facilities, including a market, schools, a hospital and transport. The main market is Haulia chowk, where road transport can be hired. The village has 2500 ration cards.

Government and private schools include the Sri M.A.D.A.P.V. school and the Shree Aditya Lal Janata Yoges High school.

References

Cities and towns in Ghazipur district
Villages in Ghazipur district